Nuha-dong is a dong, neighbourhood of Jongno-gu in Seoul, South Korea. It is a legal dong (법정동 ) administered under its administrative dong (행정동 ), Hyoja-dong.

See also 
Administrative divisions of South Korea

References

External links
 Jongno-gu Official site in English
 Jongno-gu Official site
 Status quo of Jongno-gu by administrative dong 
 Hyoja-dong Resident office 
 Origin of Nuha-dong name

Neighbourhoods of Jongno-gu